Karl Mikita (26 February 1879 Pärnu – 29 July 1933 Tallinn) was an Estonian politician. He was a member of I Riigikogu. He was a member of the Riigikogu since 18 January 1923. He replaced Paul Öpik.

References

1879 births
1933 deaths
Members of the Riigikogu, 1920–1923